Sathiyam TV is a 24x7 Tamil news and current affairs channel headquartered at Royapuram in Chennai.

Sathiyam Television is a part of Sathiyam Media Vision Private Limited, Chennai.

History
The Modi government issued an official warning to the channel for supposed violation of programme code in two of its shows, both aired on 9 December 2014. Further, it has also issued show-cause notice for 3 other ‘violations’ in May 2015.

The channel has received a lot of response following its whistleblowing in the selection process scam of TNPSC Group 1 service exam in February 2021.

Attack
A man carrying a sword entered the headquarters of Sathiyam TV and damaged properties in August 2021. The attacker even smashed the TV and decorative glass in the computer office with a handgun. He also made death threats to those who were on duty at the office. The attacker was a resident of Coimbatore, who arrived in a car with a Gujarat number plate. The Chennai Press Club has strongly condemned the incident terming it a ‘terror attack’.

References

External links 
 Sathiyam tv on YouTube
 Facebook Live News Feed

Tamil-language television channels
Television stations in Chennai